Benjamin Vermeulen (born 15 July 1957) is a former Belgian racing cyclist. He rode in the 1980 and 1981 Tour de France.

References

External links
 

1957 births
Living people
Belgian male cyclists
Sportspeople from Sint-Niklaas
Cyclists from East Flanders